The Madelung constant is used in determining the electrostatic potential of a single ion in a crystal by approximating the ions by point charges. It is named after Erwin Madelung, a German physicist.

Because the anions and cations in an ionic solid attract each other by virtue of their opposing charges, separating the ions requires a certain amount of energy. This energy must be given to the system in order to break the anion–cation bonds. The energy required to break these bonds for one mole of an ionic solid under standard conditions is the lattice energy.

Formal expression 
The Madelung constant allows for the calculation of the electric potential  of all ions of the lattice felt by the ion at position 

where  is the distance between the th and the th ion. In addition,
 number of charges of the th ion
 the elementary charge, 1.6022 C
 ;  is the permittivity of free space.

If the distances  are normalized to the nearest neighbor distance , the potential may be written

with  being the (dimensionless) Madelung constant of the th ion

Another convention is to base the reference length on the cubic root  of the unit cell volume, which for cubic systems is equal to the lattice constant. Thus, the Madelung constant then reads

The electrostatic energy of the ion at site  then is the product of its charge with the potential acting at its site

There occur as many Madelung constants  in a crystal structure as ions occupy different lattice sites. For example, for the ionic crystal NaCl, there arise two Madelung constants – one for Na and another for Cl. Since both ions, however, occupy lattice sites of the same symmetry they both are of the same magnitude and differ only by sign. The nearest neighbour distance amounts to half the lattice constant of the cubic unit cell  and the Madelung constants become

The prime indicates that the term  is to be left out. Since this sum is conditionally convergent it is not suitable as definition of Madelung's constant unless the order of summation is also specified. There are two "obvious" methods of summing this series, by expanding cubes or expanding spheres. Although the latter is often found in the literature,

it fails to converge, as was shown by Emersleben in 1951. The summation over expanding cubes converges to the correct value, although very slowly. An alternative summation procedure, presented by Borwein, Borwein and Taylor, uses analytic continuation of an absolutely convergent series.

There are many practical methods for calculating Madelung's constant using either direct summation (for example, the Evjen method) or integral transforms, which are used in the Ewald method.

Note also how the fluorite structure being intermediate between the caesium chloride and sphalerite structures is reflected in the Madelung constants.

Formula 

A fast converging formula for the Madelung constant of NaCl is

Generalization 
It is assumed for the calculation of Madelung constants that an ion's charge density may be approximated by a point charge. This is allowed, if the electron distribution of the ion is spherically symmetric. In particular cases, however, when the ions reside on lattice site of certain crystallographic point groups, the inclusion of higher order moments, i.e. multipole moments of the charge density might be required. It is shown by electrostatics that the interaction between two point charges only accounts for the first term of a general Taylor series describing the interaction between two charge distributions of arbitrary shape. Accordingly, the Madelung constant only represents the monopole-monopole term.

The electrostatic interaction model of ions in solids has thus been extended to a point multipole concept that also includes higher multipole moments like dipoles, quadrupoles etc. These concepts require the determination of higher order Madelung constants or so-called electrostatic lattice constants. The proper calculation of electrostatic lattice constants has to consider the crystallographic point groups of ionic lattice sites; for instance, dipole moments may only arise on polar lattice sites, i. e. exhibiting a C1, C1h, Cn or Cnv  site symmetry (n = 2, 3, 4 or 6). These second order Madelung constants turned out to have significant effects on the lattice energy and other physical properties of heteropolar crystals.

Application to organic salts 
The Madelung constant is also a useful quantity in describing the lattice energy of organic salts.  Izgorodina and coworkers have described a generalised method (called the EUGEN method) of calculating the Madelung constant for any crystal structure.

References

External links
 
 
 

 
 

Crystallography
Physical constants
Physical chemistry
Solid-state chemistry
Theoretical chemistry